Alder Creek is a stream in Mariposa County, California, in the United States. It is a tributary of the South Fork Merced River.

Alder Creek was likely named after Alnus rhombifolia, also known as alder.

Course
Alder Creek rises about 3 miles southeast of Badger Pass Ski Area in Mariposa County, California, and then flows southwest to join South Fork Merced River about 6 miles northwest of Wawona.

Watershed
Alder Creek drains  of area, receives about 45.6 in/year of precipitation, has a wetness index of 308.92, and is about 92% forested.

See also
List of rivers of California

References

Rivers of Northern California
Rivers of Mariposa County, California